= Conservative state =

Conservative state may refer to:

- A nation, country or subnational state that typically follows conservatism, tending to emphasize traditions such as established organized religions, having cautious fiscal and social policies, etc.
- In the United States, typically a red state, a US state that since about 1980 tends to elect members of the Republican Party more often than members of the Democratic Party
